Airi is a feminine given name used in several cultures, including Estonian, Finnish and Japanese. The Japanese name can be written as 愛里, 愛李, 愛莉, 愛理, 愛梨, 藍梨 or あいり in hiragana).

In Estonian and Finnish the name is derived from the word airut, meaning messenger or herald. As of 1 January 2022, Airi is the 240th most popular feminine given name in Estonia. 

Notable Japanese people with the name include:

, Japanese illustrator and former singer
, Japanese rhythmic gymnast
, Japanese murder victim
, Japanese model, actress, and former singer
, Japanese volleyball player
, Japanese actress and gravure idol
, Japanese gravure idol, actress and television personality
, Japanese singer, actress, model and radio personality
, Japanese violinist
, Japanese actress
, Japanese singer
, Japanese actress and singer
AiRI, Japanese singer

Other people
Airi L, British singer
Airi Mikkelä (born 1993), Finnish badminton player

Fictional characters
, a character in the media franchise Queen's Blade
Airi Ban, a character in the video game Devil Survivor 2
, a character in the anime series Tenchi Muyo!
Airi Nogami, a character in the tokusatsu series Kamen Rider Den-O
Airi Momoi, a character from the game Hatsune Miku: Colorful Stage!

References

Japanese feminine given names
Estonian feminine given names
Finnish feminine given names